Hwanggeum-dong is a ward of Suseong-gu, Daegu, South Korea.  While it is referred to locally as one district, it is in fact administered as two wards, nearly divided by Beomeo Park.  Daegu National Museum is in Hwanggeum 1 (il) dong.  Hwanggeum Shijang, a market area and major landmark, is in the far northeastern corner of Hwanggeum 2 (i) dong, near the border of Beomeo-dong.

References

External links
 Official site

Suseong District
Neighbourhoods in South Korea